Landini is an Italian surname that may refer to

Adelmo Landini (1896–1965), Italian inventor, pupil and assistant of Guglielmo Marconi
Agnese Landini (born 1976), Italian teacher, wife of former Prime Minister Matteo Renzi
Maurizio Landini (born 1961), Italian trade unionist 
Andrea Landini (1847–1935), Italian painter
Claude Landini, Swiss basketball player
Fausto Landini (born 1951), Italian football coach and player
Francesco Landini (c.1325/1335–1397), Italian composer, organist, singer, poet and instrument maker
Maria Landini (c.1668–1722), Italian soprano 
Massimiliana Landini Aleotti (born 1942/43), Italian billionaire heiress
Raúl Landini (1909–1988), Argentine boxer
Spartaco Landini (1944–2017), Italian football defender
Taddeo Landini (c.1561–1596), Italian sculptor and architect

See also 
Landi (disambiguation)
Lando (disambiguation)
Landolfi

Italian-language surnames